Abdirisak Khalif Ahmed is a Somali politician, and is the current speaker of Somaliland's Lower House of Parliament (House of Representatives). He previously served as Somaliland's Minister of Commerce during the Siilaanyo administration.

During the 2021 Somaliland parliamentary election Abdirisak, from the main opposition party Waddani, won the first round of voting with 42 votes, beating his competitor Yasin Haji Mohamoud Hiir aka "Faratoon", from the ruling Kulmiye party, who had 39 votes.

Overview 
Abdirisak Khalif Ahmed was born in 1967 in Las Anod, Somaliland. He completed his primary education in Las Anod and later moved to Somalia for further studies.

See also 

 List of Somalis

References 

1967 births
Living people
21st-century Somaliland politicians
Government ministers of Somaliland
Speakers of the House of Representatives (Somaliland)